Monique Thierry (26 March 1940 – 30 July 2021) was a French actress. She specialized in dubbing and was notably the French language voice of Wonder Woman in the 1970s TV series.

On television, Thierry rose to fame as Mariette in the television series The New Adventures of Vidocq. She was notably a voice actress in Who's the Boss?, Wonder Woman, and Roseanne.

Monique Thierry died on 30 July 2021 at the age of 81.

Theatre
L'Île des esclaves (1963)
 (1979)

Filmography
 (1961)
 (1971)
The New Adventures of Vidocq (1971)
 (1976)

References

1940 births
2021 deaths
French actresses
People from Hérault